D Y Patil International University is a private University located in Akurdi, Pune, Maharashtra, India

The university become operational as a state private university. College is carrying out inter and intra disciplinary research in thrust areas, enhancing the scope of collaborations for research and development, and boosting faculty and student exchange programs worldwide.

Academics

Undergraduate programs

 B. Tech. - CSE
 B. Tech. - BioEngineering
 B. Des.
 B.B.A.
 B.C.A.
 B.A. - JMC
 D. Pharm.

Postgraduate programs 

 M. Tech. - CSE
 M.B.A. - Digital Business
 M.B.A. - Agri-Business

Doctoral programs 

 P.Hd.

Campus 
DYPIU campus is located over vast stretch of land of around 32 acres. The campus is well maintained with great greenery by the college. The sustainable and eco-friendly system is maintained with the help of unique trees planted in campus, which is well known as the Oxygen zone of DYPIU Campus life. The fresh and green environment helps the students in developing a healthy mind and body which also help them flourish in academics

References

External links
 

Private universities in India
Universities in Maharashtra
Education in Pune
Educational institutions established in 2018
2018 establishments in Maharashtra